Paget Rangers F.C. is an English football club based in Sutton Coldfield, Birmingham, currently playing in the .

History
The club was established in 1938 by pupils of Paget Road School in Erdington, Birmingham and was accepted into the Intermediate Division of the Birmingham Juvenile Organisation Committee. In their first two seasons Paget were successful, winning the league title on both occasions, however the outbreak of World War II brought a halt to progress. At the end of the war, Paget joined the Birmingham Youth and Old Boys AFA, before moving to the Central Amateur League in 1949 and then the Worcestershire Combination (now Midland Combination) in 1950.

In 1951 Paget Rangers purchased a site on Springfield Road in Walmley for a cost of £550. Springfield Road was to be Paget's home for the next 42 years. The 1950s was a decade of consolidation for The Bears, before experiencing their first major success in 1960 when a unique quadruple was achieved: Paget won the Midland Combination League Title, the Midland Combination League Cup, the Birmingham Junior Cup and the Sutton Coldfield Charity Cup. Paget went on to retain the league title again in 1961. Further success followed in 1967 when Paget Rangers defeated Alvechurch to win the Midland Combination League cup (Alvechurch had beaten Paget in the previous year's final). In 1970 Paget won the Midland Combination Premier Division for the third time, following that success with a fourth title in 1971.

In 1971 the club erected floodlights at Springfield Road, becoming the first Midland Combination club to have floodlights. The switching on of the lights was marked by a visit of Aston Villa to Springfield Road.

Paget Rangers won their fourth Midland Combination League Cup in 1983 and a fifth success followed in 1986, earning Paget Rangers a place in the Southern League for the first time. Several players resigned followed the departure of manager Eddie Caulfield to local rivals Sutton Coldfield Town, and after one season in the Southern League the club was relegated to the West Midlands (Regional) League.

Paget adapted to the West Midlands (Regional) League and achieved a top half finish in all but one season between 1988 and 1994. The highest place achieved during this period was a second-place finish in 1992, when Gresley Rovers won the title. Success was achieved in the League Cup in 1992, when Paget Rangers defeated Gresley Rovers in a thrilling final. The club also reached the final of the League Cup in both 1993 and 1994, but finished as runners-up on both occasions.

In 1993 Paget Rangers sold their Springfield Road ground for housing development for a fee in excess of £1.4 million. Whilst a site for a new home was sought, Paget Rangers began a groundshare agreement with Sutton Coldfield Town.

In 1994, following league restructuring, Paget were elected as founder members of the new Midland Football Alliance. Paget won the inaugural championship in 1994–95 by a twelve-point margin from Hinckley Athletic to again achieve promotion to the Southern League Midland Division.

In the 1994–95 season, in addition to claiming the Midland Football Alliance Championship, Paget won the Lord Mayor of Birmingham's Charity Cup when beating Moor Green in the final, and finished as runners-up in the Staffordshire Senior Cup to Stoke City. The same season saw them reach the semi-final of the Birmingham Senior Cup, with their best-ever run in the competition which included a 2–1 victory over Coventry City in the quarter final. However, they were beaten by Aston Villa at Villa Park.

In all, throughout the 1994–95 season, a total of five Southern League Clubs were beaten in various cup competitions.
The first season in the Southern League resulted in a fifth-place finish, including victories over both Tamworth and Nuneaton Borough. Rangers were at the top of the league at Christmas 1994, after which striker Ian Bennett and midfielder David Campbell were sold to Leicester United.

After five seasons ground sharing with Sutton Coldfield Town, Paget moved to their new home at Vale Stadium at Castle Vale, for the start of the 1998/99 season. An expected increase in attendances didn't materialise, the new pitch was prone to flooding and boardroom disagreements due to the inheritance of £1.4m caused the team to struggle both on and off the pitch.

The club continued to play in the Southern League Western Division for two more seasons before relegation occurred at the end of the 2000–01 season. As the season was drawing to a close, several players departed following the withdrawal of financial support, after which several youth team players were played. Paget were relegated to the Midland Alliance, but four wins from their final six games meant Paget avoided bottom spot.

Paget's first season back in the Midland Football Alliance saw youth featured prominently as the Bears attempted to stabilise in new surroundings. Paget achieved a mid-table position in their first season back in the Midland Alliance, however the club resigned at the end of the season and subsequently folded.  The club's final game was at home to Barwell on 23 April 2002. Paget won the game 3–1.

In 2011 Paget Rangers supporter Matthew Dainty relaunched the club. After 18 months of planning Paget's application to the Midland Football Combination for the 2012–13 season was rejected, after which the club joined the Birmingham AFA where they were placed in Division 2. Paget won the Birmingham & District AFA Senior Cup at the first attempt, defeating Athletic Sparkhill in a final 6–5. In total three Premier Division clubs were defeated in the competition. Paget also came top of their league, pipping second-place Aston Reserves by a few points, to secure the AFA Division 2 title in their first season back.

For the 2013–14 season, Paget's application to the Midland Combination was successful and the club was placed in Division 3. Despite establishing a twelve-point lead by Christmas, the Bears were eventually caught and overtaken by eventual champions Kenilworth Town and runners-up Coventry United. 3rd place however, was sufficient to see the club promoted to the Midland Football League 2nd Division for the 2014–15 season. Paget also reached the final of the Smedley Crooke Memorial Cup in 2013–14, going down by 4 goals 1 against Bromsgrove Sporting at their Victoria Road ground in front of a crowd of 408.

After consolidating during the 2014–15 season, Paget enjoyed a more successful season in 2015–16, securing a 4th place finish in the Midland Football League Second Division, which included a 15 game unbeaten run in the latter part of the season

In the 2016–17 season Paget enjoyed a more successful season after gaining promotion as champions of Division 2. This was followed by winning the Les James Challenge Cup at the home of Walsall FC, against Redditch Borough.

After three seasons of consolidation in the Midlands Football League First Division, Matthew Dainty took the decision to step down as Chairman. Matthew’s legacy at Paget Rangers is assured having resurrected the Club and overseen the Club’s rise to Step 6 of the Non League pyramid.

And so it was that just prior to the Coronavirus pandemic in 2020, a consortium led by James Parker took over the Club. Parker was already Chairman of Birmingham St Georges Junior Football Club, with teams from U8 – U18. In fact, following the takeover, all of those Junior Teams re-branded and so from the beginning of the 2020/21 season Paget Rangers had teams competing at every age group from u8 through to the First Team.

The 2020–21 season, like the season before, was heavily disrupted by the Covid pandemic and brought to an early finish but not before Paget had enjoyed some success in the FA Vase, with victory over Wolverhampton Casuals and a stunning away victory at Chelmsley Town, before their Wembley dream was ended by Radford.

In May 2021 and in anticipation of the 2021–22 season Paget announced the appointment of Steve Walker as their new First Team Manager, something of a coup for Paget. Walker who has spent the previous 8 years working at Step 3, with both Coalville and Stratford Town brings a wealth of coaching experience and a backroom team determined to continue Paget’s upwards journey.

Ground
Paget Rangers were originally based at the Gas Ground in Erdington, just off Paget Road and close to Paget School. In 1950 the club purchased the Springfield Road ground in Walmley which was to be Paget's home until the mid-1990s. Following the sale of the Springfield Road ground, Paget entered into a groundshare agreement with Sutton Coldfield Town for five seasons prior to moving to their new Castle Vale stadium in 1998. When the club was reformed in 2011, Paget entered into an agreement to play home games back at "The Gas Ground", Hollyfields Sports and Social, just off Paget Road in Erdington where the original club was formed. For the 2013–14 season Paget Rangers agreed a ground share with Boldmere St Michaels. For the 2018/19 season Paget have moved to groundshare at Sutton Coldfield Town's Coles Lane ground.

Honours
The club has the following honours:

Midland Football Combination
 Champions 1959–60, 1960–61, 1969–70, 1970–71
Midland Football League
 Division 2 Champions 2016–17
Midland Football Alliance 
Champions 1994–95
West Midlands (Regional) League
 Runners-up 1991–92
B.Y.C. Intermediate League
 Champions 1938–39, 1940–41
Midland Youth Floodlit League 
Champions 1999–2000
Birmingham & District AFA Division 2
 Champions 2012–13

Cups
Birmingham AFA Senior Cup 
Winners 2013
West Midland League Cup 
Winners 1992 
Runners-up 1993, 1994
Les James Challenge Cup 
Winners 1960, 1967, 1971, 1983, 1986, 2017
Birmingham Senior Cup 
Semi-finalist 1994
Birmingham Junior Cup 
Winners 1960, 1970
Lord Mayor of Birmingham Charity Cup 
Winners 1995
Walsall Senior Cup
Winners 1986
Staffordshire Senior Cup
Finalist 1995 
Semi-finalist 1994
Tony Alden Memorial cup
Winners 1971, 1973, 1984, 1987
Sutton Coldfield Charity Cup
Winners 1958, 1960, 1966, 1968, 1999, 2002
Smedley Crooke Memorial Cup
Finalist 2014

Club records
Record Attendance since reformation : 311 (vs Hinckley AFC 13/11/16)
Best league performance: 5th in Southern League Midland Division, 1995–96
Best FA Cup performance: 3rd qualifying round, 1994–95
Best FA Trophy performance: 2nd round proper 1998–99 
Best FA Vase performance: 4th round, 1988–89

Managerial statistics

Kit

Rivalries
Paget's main rivals are Sutton Coldfield Town, Boldmere St. Michaels and Sutton United with whom the club has risen through the divisions in recent seasons.

Season history

References

External links
 Official Club website
 Paget Rangers on Football Club History Database

Association football clubs established in 1938
Football clubs in the West Midlands (county)
1938 establishments in England
Sutton Coldfield
Erdington
Midland Football League
Midland Football Combination
Football clubs in England
Central Amateur League